José Acasuso was the defending champion, but lost in the second round to Rubén Ramírez Hidalgo.

Florent Serra won the title by defeating Igor Andreev 6–3, 6–4 in the final.

Seeds

Draw

Finals

Top half

Bottom half

References

External links
 Official results archive (ATP)
 Official results archive Qualifying (ATP)
 Official results archive (ITF)

Tennis tournaments in Romania
2005 in tennis
Romanian Open